Amélie Mauresmo was the defending champion, but she withdrew due to illness.

Martina Hingis won the first title in four years, beating in the final Dinara Safina with the score 6–2, 7–5.

Seeds
The top eight seeds received a bye into the second round. Champion seeds are shown in bold while text in italics indicates the round in which seeds were eliminated.

Draw

Finals

Top half

Section 1

Section 2

Bottom half

Section 3

Section 4

External links
Draw

Italian Open - Singles
Women's Singles